The 1982 All-SEC football team consists of American football players selected to the All-Southeastern Conference (SEC) chosen by various selectors for the 1982 college football season.

Offensive selections

Receivers 

 Willie Gault, Tennessee (AP-1, UPI)

Tight ends 

 Allama Matthews, Vanderbilt (AP-1, UPI)

Tackles
Joe Beazley, Alabama (AP-1)
Lance Smith, LSU (AP-1)
Jimmy Harper, Georgia (UPI)
Pat Phenix, Ole Miss (UPI)

Guards 
Wayne Harris, Miss. St. (AP-1, UPI)
David Jordan, Auburn (AP-1)
Steve Mott, Alabama (UPI)

Centers 
Wayne Radloff, Georgia (AP-1, UPI)

Quarterbacks 

 Whit Taylor, Vanderbilt (AP-1, UPI)

Running backs 

 Herschel Walker, Georgia (College Football Hall of Fame) (AP-1, UPI)
Dalton Hilliard, LSU (AP-1)
James Jones, Florida (AP-1)
Bo Jackson, Auburn (College Football Hall of Fame) (UPI)
Danny Knight, Miss. St. (UPI)

Defensive selections

Ends
Freddie Gilbert, Georgia (AP-1, UPI)
Mike Pitts, Alabama (AP-1, UPI)

Tackles 
Ramsey Dardar, LSU (AP-1, UPI)
Doug Smith, Auburn (AP-1)
Jimmy Payne, Georgia (UPI)
Billy Jackson, Miss. St. (UPI)

Middle guards
Dowe Aughtman, Auburn (AP-1)

Linebackers 
Tommy Thurson, Georgia (AP-1, UPI)
Al Richardson, LSU (AP-1, UPI)
Wilber Marshall, Florida (AP-1, UPI)

Backs 
Terry Hoage, Georgia (AP-1, UPI)
Jeremiah Castille, Alabama (AP-1, UPI)
Jeff Sanchez, Georgia (AP-1, UPI)
James Britt, LSU (AP-1)

Special teams

Kicker 
Fuad Reveiz, Tennessee (AP-1, UPI)

Punter 
 Jim Arnold, Vanderbilt (AP-1, UPI)

Key
AP = Associated Press

UPI = United Press International

Bold = Consensus first-team selection by both AP and UPI

See also
1982 College Football All-America Team

References

All-SEC
All-SEC football teams